Origins is the fourth studio album by the American pop rock band Imagine Dragons, released on November 9, 2018 by Kidinakorner, Polydor Records and Interscope Records.

The album was produced by the band members themselves, frequent collaborator Alex da Kid, Mattman & Robin, John Hill, Joel Little, Tim Randolph, and Jayson DeZuzio, who produced a majority of the band's previous effort, Evolve (2017), as well as Jorgen Odegard.  Frontman Dan Reynolds described Origins as a "sister album" to Evolve, and that it would complete a cycle of their music.

Origins received generally mixed reviews from critics, but many claimed that the album is an improvement from Evolve.  The album was preceded by four singles: "Natural", "Zero", "Machine" and "Bad Liar". An additional single, "Birds", was released in 2019.

Background
The album cover for Origins, along with several pieces of merchandise revolving around the album were leaked online on October 2, 2018. The following day, Imagine Dragons officially announced the album to the public with a trailer. Within the trailer, the band spoke about why they were releasing a new album so soon after their previous album Evolve, along with just finishing the Evolve World Tour in September 2018. Lead singer Dan Reynolds stated that although bands typically take a break for a while after touring, the band had already written songs that felt right to produce and release immediately, as they would be in a completely different place in the future. The end of the Evolve World Tour immediately concluded the Evolve album cycle, and began the Origins album cycle.

Composition
Hannah Mylrea of NME described the album as "stuffed full of stadium-filling slices of the band's trademark electronic infused pop-rock",  while Stephen Thomas Erlewine of AllMusic stated that he felt the band attempted to make Origins blend in with rock, pop, electronic, and soul music playlists.

Promotion
The group announced the title of their fourth album on October 3, 2018, via social media. The album was put up for pre-order that same day. There are three versions of the album: a standard version which includes 12 songs, a deluxe edition which includes 15 songs, and an international deluxe edition which includes 16 songs.

On October 20, 2018, the band revealed the track listing for the standard version of the album on Twitter. The next day, they revealed the track listing for the deluxe album.

Singles
On July 17, 2018, "Natural" was released as the lead single. To promote the single, it was chosen by ESPN as the anthem of the 2018 College Football season. The song has since peaked at No. 13 on the Billboard Hot 100. Its music video starring the band was released on August 24, 2018.
 
On September 19, 2018, "Zero" was released as the second single. The song is featured in the Disney animated film Ralph Breaks the Internet and was included in its second official trailer, along with the ending credits for the film. The music video, which takes place in an arcade and includes several references to the film, was released on October 23, 2018. The song peaked at No.  10 on the Billboard Hot Rock Songs chart.

On October 31, 2018, Imagine Dragons released the third single off the album, "Machine".

On November 6, 2018, "Bad Liar" was released as the fourth single. The song has since peaked at No. 56 on the Billboard Hot 100. A music video for the song was released on January 24, 2019.

On June 21, 2019, Imagine Dragons released the fifth single off the album, "Birds", featuring Italian singer Elisa. The original album version of the song had already charted in some countries earlier that month. An animated music video for the original song was released on July 23, 2019.

Critical reception

At Metacritic, which assigns a normalized rating out of 100 to reviews from ten mainstream critics, Origins has an average score of 59 based on ten reviews, indicating "mixed or average reviews". The Independent gave the album a positive review, stating that "Origins is further proof of Reynolds' pop songwriting capabilities and also his ambition when it comes to pushing the messages that matter onto the charts. And there's no doubting his sincerity. It's a refreshing quality in a pop frontman." Newsday also gave the album a positive review, saying this: "It's no wonder that "Origins" sounds like the start of something even bigger for Imagine Dragons." Digital Journal gave the album a highly positive review, saying "Overall, the new Imagine Dragons album is highly eclectic. There is something in it for every music fan. Dan Reynolds and the band never disappoint." The Heights gave the album a positive review, stating "While the album may sound bombastic and derivative to critics, Origins''' eclectic song list is sure to be an instant crowd-pleaser and will impress in the inevitable stadium tour." Another positive review came from The Daily Campus, which stated that "Imagine Dragons has once again shown why they are one of the most popular rock bands in the world with "Origins" including a plethora of contagious rock-pop anthems that will have fans singing their hearts out across the country."

A more mixed review came from AllMusic, which noted that "the group takes pains to be able to fit onto every kind of playlist imaginable: rock, pop, electronic, soul-any popular sound that can be sculpted and shaped by a streaming service" and that "everything sounds vaguely familiar, vaguely connected, all designed to function as a soundtrack to whatever task you'd like". Pitchfork also gave the album a mixed review, stating "Reynolds has a story to tell, but the music fails to be the ideal delivery system." The Guardian gave the album a negative review, stating that "the most streamed rock band in the world may want us to believe that they are angry philosophers, but the reality doesn't change a gilt-edged mainstream formula." The Irish Times was also strongly critical, lambasting the album as a "muddled and incoherent mess with all of the best intentions". NME also gave a negative review, stating "scattershot and uninspired, 'Origins', the fourth album from the bafflingly popular Imagine Dragons, make for a grueling listen."

Commercial performanceOrigins'' debuted at number two on the US Billboard 200 with 91,000 album-equivalent units (including 61,000 pure album sales), making it the band's fourth top two album and their third album to debut at number 2. As of August 31, 2021, the album has been certified Platinum in the United States by the Recording Industry Association of America (RIAA) for sales of 1 million units in the country alone.

Track listing

Personnel
Dan Reynolds – lead vocals (all tracks); additional backing vocals (tracks: 1-10 and 12), keyboards (tracks: 2-5 and 9-12), acoustic guitar
Wayne Sermon – electric guitar, acoustic guitar, violin, backing vocals
Ben McKee – bass guitar, keyboards, backing vocals
Daniel Platzman – drums, viola, percussion, backing vocals

Charts

Weekly charts

Year-end charts

Certifications

References

2018 albums
Imagine Dragons albums
Polydor Records albums
Interscope Records albums
Interscope Geffen A&M Records albums
Kidinakorner albums
Albums produced by Joel Little
Albums produced by Mattman & Robin